Uttarakhand Transport Corporation also referred to as UTC or Uttarakhand Roadways, is the state run bus service of Uttarakhand state of India. UTC buses serves routes to towns and cities within Uttarakhand and adjoining states and union territtories of Himachal Pradesh, Chandigarh, Punjab, Haryana, Delhi, Rajasthan, Uttar Pradesh, Madhya Pradesh covering over 350,000 kilometers catering to the travel needs of over 100,000 people every day. It also offers a facility for online booking of tickets.

History
Upon bifurcation of Uttar Pradesh in year 2000, the newly created Uttarakhand state felt the need of its own state owned transport agency, hence Uttarakhand Transport Corporation (UTC) was incorporated on 30 October 2003 under the provisions of the Road Transport Act, 1950.

Supporting infrastructure
UTC has its corporate office at Dehradun, and three divisional offices at Dehradun, Nainital and Tanakpur. Each division has a regional workshop where major repair and maintenance work as well as assembly reconditioning work is performed. Each region has been further divided into operational units called Depots. The total number of depots in the corporation is 19, each depot has a workshop attached to it to provide supportive maintenance facilities. UTC also owns one tyre retreading plant at Dehradun to provide in-house tyre retreading facilities.

Fleet

UTC currently owns over 1355 buses. Of the total buses, around 600 ply on hilly routes of the state. UTC categorize its buses into 5 categories as Volvo buses, Deluxe buses, Air Conditioned buses, Low floor buses that ply in association with JNURM to fulfill urban transportation needs, and Ordinary buses.
Current buses-to-staff ratio is 3.71

References

External links
Official website 
Association of State Road Transport Undertakings (ASRTU)

State agencies of Uttarakhand
State road transport corporations of India
Transport in Uttarakhand
2003 establishments in Uttarakhand
Transport companies established in 2003
Indian companies established in 2003
Government agencies established in 2003